Wonder Works is a children's museum in Oak Park, Illinois.

Wonder Works or WonderWorks may also refer to:

 WonderWorks, a PBS children's TV show
 WonderWorks (museum), a series of family entertainment centers in the USA
 Wonder Works, a video game studio founded by YouTuber Megan Letter

See also
 Wonder Workshop, an American education and robotics company
 Wonderworking, the working of magic or miracles